Milton Batista Vieira Júnior (born 27 March 1991), known as Milton Júnior, is a Brazilian footballer who plays for Grêmio Novorizontino as a defensive midfielder.

Club career
Born in Nova Andradina, Mato Grosso do Sul, Milton Júnior graduated with Internacional's youth setup. He made his senior debuts in 2011, appearing with the side in the year's Campeonato Gaúcho.

On 26 December 2011 Milton Júnior joined Sport in a season-long loan deal. After being a regular starter in Campeonato Pernambucano, he made his Série A debut on 6 June 2012, coming on as a second-half substitute in a 2–1 home win against Palmeiras.

On 21 March 2013 Milton Júnior rescinded with Inter and signed for ASA until the end of the year. On 26 December, after appearing sparingly, he moved to Ferroviária.

On 1 June 2015 Milton Júnior was loaned to Portuguesa, until December. On 18 January of the following year, after rescinding his contract with Ferroviária, he returned to Lusa in a permanent deal.

References

External links

External links

1991 births
Living people
Sportspeople from Mato Grosso do Sul
Brazilian footballers
Association football midfielders
Campeonato Brasileiro Série A players
Campeonato Brasileiro Série B players
Campeonato Brasileiro Série C players
J3 League players
Sport Club Internacional players
Sport Club do Recife players
SC Sagamihara players
Agremiação Sportiva Arapiraquense players
Associação Ferroviária de Esportes players
Associação Portuguesa de Desportos players
Red Bull Brasil players